Tirabad (also Romanized as Tīrābād) is a village in Barvanan-e Gharbi Rural District, Torkamanchay District, Meyaneh County, East Azerbaijan Province, Iran. At the 2006 census, its population was 132, in 26 families.

References 

Populated places in Meyaneh County